Côme Clausse de Marchaumont (ca. 1548 – April 1, 1624) was a French Roman Catholic prelate. He was bishop of Châlons between 1574 and 1624.

Biography 
Côme Clausse de Marchaumont was the fourth son of Côme Clausse and Marie, the sister of bishop Jérôme Burgensis, after whom he became commendatory abbot of Saint-Pierre-aux-Monts Abbey. In 1574, he succeeded his brother Nicolas to the bishopric of Châlons; Nicolas had inherited the title from their mother's brother. Clausse de Marchaumont was consecrated in 1575 by Nicolas Psaume, the bishop of Verdun.

In the course of his half-century-long bishopric, he attended the coronation of Henry III in 1575 and of Louis XIII in 1610. He received Recollects and Jesuits in Châlons in 1613. On April 28, 1608, he became coadjutor bishop to his nephew Henri Clausse de Fleury, who was appointed titular bishop of Auzia in Maghreb (today in northern Algeria).

Marchaumont died on April 1, 1624. His nephew succeeded him to the see of Châlons.

References 

Bishops of Châlons-sur-Marne
16th-century French Roman Catholic bishops
17th-century French Roman Catholic bishops
1624 deaths
Year of birth uncertain